Ulf Johan Norrman (16 March 1935 – 20 January 2020) was a Swedish Olympic sailor in the Star class. He competed in the 1968 Summer Olympics together with John Albrechtson, where they finished 9th. He was born in Gothenburg, Sweden.

References

Olympic sailors of Sweden
Swedish male sailors (sport)
Star class sailors
Sailors at the 1968 Summer Olympics – Star
1935 births
2020 deaths
Sportspeople from Gothenburg
20th-century Swedish people